Parliamentary elections were held in Transkei on 29 September 1976. The Transkei National Independence Party  won 69 of the 75 elected seats.

Results

Aftermath
By-elections were held to fill the two vacant seats, both won by the Transkei National Independence Party.

References

Transkei
1976
September 1976 events in Africa